Summer Song is part of Mannheim Steamroller's Ambience collection.  It was released in 2001 on CD by American Gramaphone and features 7 summer-themed tracks.

The Ambience collection is a series of natural recordings with musical elements composed by Chip Davis.

Track listing
 "A Clearing" – 4:50
 "Raindance" – 6:10
 "Teardrops Raindrops" – 7:55
 "Sun in the Rain" – 10:35
 "Midday Reflection" – 7:20
 "Summer Song" – 8:00
 "Bittersweet" – 6:10

Personnel
Bobby Jenkins – Oboe

References
Mannheim Steamroller Summer Song compact disc.  American Gramaphone AG203-2

2001 albums
American Gramaphone albums